Ceratophyton is a genus of Cambrian acritarch, around 100–200 µm in length, produced by a eukaryotic (metazoan?) organism.

Affinity
Ceratophyton has been interpreted as an originally chitinous component of a metazoan.  An arthropod relationship has been proposed, although on a more conservative view it is difficult to provide confident classification beyond saying that they are fragments of a eukaryote. Particular species, however, show promising similarity to the sclerites of modern priapulid worms.

Species

C. vernicosum
This species, the type, comprises a single unornamented cone.
This species occurs in platform settings in western Russia in the Lontova and Lyukati horizons, first occurring in the local base of the 'Cambrian'. In Poland it occurs from the base of the Cambrian (Platysolenites zone) to the Schmidtiellus zone.

It has been reported from the middle Cambrian of Belgium, although these specimens are short on diagnostic features.

It also occurs below the T. pedum zone, indicating the presence of the producer in the Ediacaran period.

C. circufuntum
This species is represented by single cones that have rings around their bases.

C. duplicum

This taxon has a double wall, resembling a pair of stacked cones; it may represent a taphomorph of C. vernicosum.

C. dumufuntum
This single cone has short conical spines, which occur on its basal region.
This species is known from the mid-to-late Atdabanian siltstones of the Ouldburra formation of Australia.

C. spinuconum
This species  again comprises a single cone; it has spines and processes along both margins.

Differences from other taxa 
Ceratophyton differs from the taxon Veryhachium in having a basal opening.

References

Cambrian life
Acritarch genera